Mike Temwanjera  (born 21 May 1982) is a Zimbabwean former professional footballer who usually played as a centre forward, but also as a second striker. A member of FC Vaslui from January 2007 until summer 2014, he was one of the team's longest serving players, second in scoring during Vaslui's spell in Liga I, with 39 goals. He also appeared once for the Zimbabwe national team.

Club career 
Temwanjera was born Harare, Zimbabwe.

CAPS United 
Until 2003 Temwanjera played with CAPS United, traditionally one of the strongest teams in the Zimbabwe Premier Soccer League.

FK Javor 
In 2003 Temwanjera came to Serbia for trials with FK Javor Ivanjica, a club that six months earlier had imported two of his CAPS United colleagues, Leonard Tsipa and Blessing Makunike. The season that he arrived, Javor had just been relegated from the top league, so Temwanjera played in the Serbian Second League during his first two seasons. It was at the end of the 2004–05 season that Javor returned to the First League of Serbia and Montenegro. In the 2005–06 season, Temwanjera played 26 matches and scored 3 goals. However, the club finished 12th and was relegated again.

Borac Čačak 
In the summer of 2006, the league in Serbia was renamed the SuperLiga. FK Javor was playing in the Serbian First League, formerly known as Second League. Temwanjera's performances in the previous season has caught the attention of some top league clubs, and in July he signed with FK Borac Čačak. By the end of the first half of the 2006–07 Serbian SuperLiga, Temwanjera had played 16 matches and scored 3 goals, and the club was having a mediocre season. During one march, discontented supporters shouted racially abusive remarks at Temwanjera, who decided to leave the club immediately afterwards. The quickest one to react was Romanian Liga I club SC Vaslui that brought him in that 2006–07 winter transfer window.

Vaslui 
In February 2007, Temwanjera completed his move to Vaslui on a four-and-a-half-year contract for an undisclosed fee. On 27 January, while he was still on trial, Temwanjera made his unofficial debut for Vaslui, against FCM Bârlad, scoring three times in the process. On 24 February, Temwanjera made his competitive debut for Vaslui, in a 1–1 away draw against Farul Constanţa. Two weeks later, he scored the equaliser, in the 1–1 draw against FC Argeş, counting his first Liga I goal. On 6 April, he scored twice in the home league match against Gloria Bistriţa, once for his own team, and once in his own net. Vaslui eventually won the game with 3–2. In the 2006–07 campaign, he played every single match for Vaslui, scoring three times and helping his team to finish 8th in Liga I, competition best at the time for the Moldavian team.

On 27 July 2007, Temwanjera scored his team's second goal, in Vaslui's opening match against UTA Arad. Nine days later, he provided his first assist from the new season, helping Adrian Gheorghiu to score for 2–0, against Dinamo București. On 31 October, Vaslui won against arch rivals Politehnica Iaşi, thanks to Temwanjera's only goal from the 50th minute. Following a 1–0 loss against Steaua București, and due to his low goal-per-match rate, Temwanjera was put on the transfer list, alongside many other teammates. However, on 7 May 2008, he was not for sale any more, following his two goals scored against Rapid București. He finished 7th with his team in Liga I, thus qualifying in the European Competitions, for the first time.

Although in July 2008, it was rumoured that Metalurh Donetsk was interested in Temwanjera, he eventually remained in Vaslui. On 26 July, he scored his first European goal in UEFA Intertoto's Third Round, against Neftchi Baku, helping his team to advance in the UEFA Cup, for the first time. One week later, he scored the equaliser in the Moldavian Derby against Politehnica Iaşi, match eventually won by Vaslui with 3–1. In August, he provided six points for his team, scoring Vaslui's winning goals against Gloria Bistriţa and Oţelul Galaţi. On 5 October, he scored his first cup goal, in his first Romanian Cup appearance against Politehnica Iaşi. On 28 November, he scored his sixth league goal against Universitatea Craiova, surpassing his own personal tally from the previous season. On 18 April 2009, he scored Vaslui's third in a 4–3 home win against Politehnica Timişoara. On 6 May, he scored his last goal of the season, against Pandurii Târgu Jiu, taking his tally of goals to 11. Despite Vaslui's up and down season, he managed to finish 5th with his team, securing its spot for UEFA Europa League, for the second year in a row.

Temwanjera started the 2009–10 season with a double in Vaslui's opening game against Omonia Nicosia. On 23 August, he scored his first league goal against Gloria Bistriţa, giving his team a 2–1 lead. Vaslui eventually won with 3–1. On 23 September, he scored his second double from the season, in the cup match against Chimia Brazi. On 3 October, Temwanjera scored his team's second goal in Marius Lăcătuş's first competitive match as manager, in Vaslui's 3–1 home win over Astra Ploieşti. On 7 November, he scored the winning goal against Ceahlăul Piatra Neamţ. On 23 November, Temwanjera scored Vaslui's first goal, from the 2–0 home league win against CFR Cluj, helping his team winning the eighth match in a row. On 27 February 2010, he suffered a meniscal laceration, in the 2–1 home league win against Pandurii Târgu Jiu, which forced him out from the field for almost nine months.

On 4 November 2010, Mike was awarded "Sportsman of the Year in Vaslui", for his entire activity for the club. After being sidelined for nine months, he returned for Vaslui's 3–1 league win over Pandurii Târgu Jiu on 26 November, coming as a late substitute for Yero Bello. On 12 April 2011, he was in the startup team against Gloria Bistriţa, for the first time since February 2010, and he managed to score Vaslui's only goal. Late in April, following his Romanian citizenship request, he stated "My future is tied with this town. I am happy here, and I want to end my career in the yellow-green shirt, when the time will come." On 9 May, in a league game against Astra Ploieşti, he was sent off for a bad foul on Alexandru Măţel. He was punished with a two-match ban with two rounds to spare, meaning that Temwanjera's season was over.

On 24 July 2011, played his 100th Liga I match, in Vaslui's opening game against Rapid București. He is only the second Vaslui player, to achieve this feat, joining Bogdan Buhuş. On 18 August, Temwanjera scored his first goal of the season as he netted Vaslui's first in a 2–0 home win over Sparta Prague, helping his team qualifying for the first time in the UEFA Europa League's Group Stages. Three days later, he scored his first league goal of the season, in a 2–1 home defeat against newly promoted Ceahlăul Piatra Neamţ. One week later, he scored the 2–1 winning goal for Vaslui, against FC Braşov. On 11 September, he scored the equaliser against Dinamo București, counting his third league goal in a row. Vaslui went on winning with 3–1. Four days later, he won a penalty that gave Vaslui a 2–1 lead in the first match from the group stages of UEFA Europa League against Lazio, after Wesley converted from the spot. The game eventually ended a 2–2 draw. He scored his second goal in UEFA Europa League against FC Zurich in 2–2 draw. On 7 May 2012, he scored a hattrick against Gaz Metan Mediaş.He ended the season with a total of 7 goals in Liga I.

International career
Temwanjera made his debut for the Zimbabwe national team in 2005 while playing with FK Javor in a friendly game against Zambia. It remained his only international appearance.

Personal life
His brother David and Jealous Wilson, are also footballers too. In 2012, Temwanjera created his own football academy in Zimbabwe which he named Vaslui Football Academy, after the Vaslui club he played for in Romania.

Career statistics

Club

Honours
Vaslui
Liga I runner-up: 2011–12
Cupa României runner-up: 2009–10
UEFA Intertoto Cup: 2008

References

External links

1972 births
Living people
Sportspeople from Harare
Association football forwards
Zimbabwean footballers
Zimbabwe international footballers
CAPS United players
FK Javor Ivanjica players
FK Borac Čačak players
FC Vaslui players
Mike Temwanjera
Serbian SuperLiga players
Liga I players
Mike Temwanjera
Zimbabwean expatriate footballers
Expatriate footballers in Serbia
Expatriate footballers in Romania
Zimbabwean expatriate sportspeople in Romania
Expatriate footballers in Thailand
Zimbabwean expatriate sportspeople in Thailand